Charles Marcus Matthau (born December 10, 1962) is an American actor, director, producer, and writer. He is the son of actor Walter Matthau and actress/author Carol Grace. Matthau gained recognition for his directorial work encapsulating humanity and humor, and is known for his film adaptations of books. He transitioned from an audio commentator in the Paramount Centennial Collection edition of The Odd Couple to a director over the years.

Apart from being a director, Matthau has an avid interest in reading about history and raising funds for cancer research. He gained wide recognition making it to the list of 10 Best Films of 1990 by the Council of Film Organizations.

Life and career
Matthau was born on December 10, 1962, in New York City, to actor Walter Matthau and actress Carol Grace, who was the model for the flighty personality of Holly Golightly in Breakfast at Tiffany's. Matthau-Grace family is Platinum Circle Award honoree from the American Film Institute. He appeared as a child actor alongside his father in such films as Charley Varrick (1973), The Bad News Bears (1976), and House Calls (1978). He became active in his father's production company, Walcar Productions, in 1978. Among his directorial projects have been The Grass Harp, from a novella by Truman Capote, and the made-for-TV movie The Marriage Fool, both of which starred his father.  He also directed Doin' Time on Planet Earth (1988), Her Minor Thing (2005), Baby-O (2009), The Book of Leah (2019), and Freaky Deaky (2012), which premiered at the Tribeca Film Festival.

In 1986, he had received an agreement with film production/distribution studio The Cannon Group, Inc., to develop, direct and distribute a feature film that was made by the Cannon studio.

In 2012, Matthau wrote, produced, and directed the film Freaky Deaky, an adaptation of Elmore Leonard's novel, with outstanding performances from Christian Slater and Crispin Glover. The heist-laden plot with heightened reality chronicles the exploits of two bomb-loving, eco-terrorist, radical antagonists, with a trailblazing cop, reviving the indie film idealistic with isolated eccentric characters surpassing the threshold for liberating presentation.

Matthau played the role of the sarcastic boyfriend in the 2005 Going Shopping. He directed the well-received romantic comedy feature, Her Minor Thing starring Estella Warren, Christian Kane, and Michael Weatherly. The film tells the story of the repercussions of the off and on-line life clashes.

In 1991, he directed a TV movie, Mrs. Lambert Remembers Love, starring Walter Matthau, Ellen Burstyn, and Ryan Todd. The movie tells the moving story of a grandmother's love, who has dementia, for her orphaned grandson.

In 1995, he directed and produced the critically acclaimed evocative rendering of Truman Capote's autobiographical novel, The Grass Harp. The story is based on an orphaned boy's atmospheric tale watching the eccentric grown-ups in a small town experiencing freedom, love, individuality, and storytelling, with upstanding tech touches. "The Grass Harp is a low-key character drama with flourishes of humor, and it's loaded with wonderful performances from an all-star ensemble cast... In fact, the film is so mature and sensitive that it's hard to believe the director is only in his mid-30s." - Chris Hicks, Movie Critic. Matthau poured all the nostalgia of the far-gone era as a sweet, nice-and-easy, and sentimental piece, invoking modernistic standards with characteristic dimensions. He featured his father Walter Matthau, saying, "At that time, as my dad was turning 70, my goal was, 'Who cares what people are going to say? I want to work with him.'" He, too, played the role of Barbershop Regular.

In 1995, Matthau appeared as Scotty Youngman in the film Number One Fan. In 1997, he appeared in the TV movie documentary, Walter Matthau: Diamond in the Rough. A year later, he directed the television movie, The Marriage Fool (aka Love After Death), casting his father, Walter Matthau, and Carol Burnett, telling a story of boundless love free from the conformity chains and preconceived notions of time. He also played the role of a salesperson. The Marriage Fool was ranked the number 1 program of the week with a 14.0 Nielsen rating and a 23 share on CBS Television Network.

He is overseeing two television mini-series, 1920 The Year of The Six Presidents, based on the book by historian David Pietrusza and T.D. Riznor's Freaky Deaky High, book series for TV, accumulating Riznor's novels, Killer Ride, Student Boy, Photo Bomb, and The Locker, untangling the high school gambit with a touch of suspense. "The project is being billed as a Black Mirror but set at the same high school, with each episode in regards to its protag running the social gamut of freshman, sophomore, junior, senior, rich kid, poor kid, model, cast-out, tech-head and more." - Anthony D'Alessandro, Box Office Editor.

He was named for his mother's stepfather, aviation industrialist Charles Marcus and for his godfather, Charlie Chaplin. He attended the University of Southern California, where he met his first wife, Michele Bauer. His former wife, Ashley, and he were seen on an episode of HGTV's Selling New York in June 2013. Ashley is a dancer and working on her own teahouse.

Philanthropy
Charlie Matthau is one of three founding  directors for the Maria Gruber Foundation, a nonprofit charitable foundation based in Beverly Hills, California. He has expressed that the Maria Gruber Foundation aligns with his philanthropic goals. The foundation's mission focuses on raising awareness through education by creating collaborative educational tools, a support system with guidance counselors, grief counselors, and volunteers, and removing some of the personal and familial helplessness from the diagnosis of a terminal disease.

References

External links
 

1962 births
Living people
20th-century American male actors
21st-century American male actors
American male actors
American people of Lithuanian-Jewish descent
American people of Russian-Jewish descent
American people of Ukrainian-Jewish descent
American television directors
Jewish American male actors
Male actors from New York City
21st-century American Jews